The 1940–41 NCAA football bowl games were the final games of the 1940 college football season and featured five games, all of which had been held the previous season. All five bowls were played on January 1, 1941. The national championship was split by Minnesota, Boston College, Tennessee, and Stanford.

Bowl schedule

Game recaps

Rose Bowl

Sugar Bowl

Orange Bowl

Sun Bowl

Cotton Bowl Classic

References